The Moon and the Melodies is a collaborative studio album by Scottish dream pop band Cocteau Twins and the American minimalist composer Harold Budd. It was released 10 November 1986 by 4AD. The name "Cocteau Twins" did not appear on the release, which instead credited the band's three members (Elizabeth Fraser, Robin Guthrie and Simon Raymonde) and Budd individually.

A version of the track "Memory Gongs" was released on Budd's Lovely Thunder as "Flowered Knife Shadows", dedicated to Raymonde.

The phrases "bloody and blunt" and "ooze out and away, onehow" came from Fraser's lyrics on the songs "The Tinderbox (Of a Heart)" and "My Love Paramour", both from the 1983 Cocteau Twins album Head Over Heels.

Fraser sings on tracks 1, 4, 5 and 8. The saxophonist Richard Thomas of Dif Juz appeared on tracks 5, 6 and 7.

Track listing
All songs written by Elizabeth Fraser, Robin Guthrie, Simon Raymonde and Harold Budd.
 "Sea, Swallow Me"  – 3:10
 "Memory Gongs"  – 7:26
 "Why Do You Love Me?"  – 4:48
 "Eyes are Mosaics"  – 4:10
 "She Will Destroy You"  – 4:14
 "The Ghost Has No Home"  – 7:36
 "Bloody and Blunt"  – 2:16
 "Ooze Out and Away, Onehow"  – 3:40

Personnel
 Harold Budd – piano
 Elizabeth Fraser – vocals
 Robin Guthrie – guitar
 Simon Raymonde – bass guitar

Additional personnel
 Richard Thomas – saxophone, drums

References

Harold Budd albums
Cocteau Twins albums
1986 albums
4AD albums
Ambient albums